Guðjón Skúlason (born 1 January 1967) is an Icelandic retired basketball player and coach and a former member of Icelandic national team. He played nineteen seasons in the Úrvalsdeild karla, winning the Icelandic championship six times with Keflavík. He was named the Icelandic Basketball Player of the Year in 1997.

Playing career

College career
In 1990, Guðjón joined the Auburn University at Montgomery and played for the Auburn Montgomery Warhawks. Despite having joined AUM, Guðjón played with Keflavík during the 1991 Cup finals and the 1991 Úrvalsdeild playoffs. During the playoffs, he averaged 11.3 points in 8 games.

Club career
Guðjón played 19 seasons in the Úrvalsdeild karla, averaging 16.3 points in 409 games. His best statistical season came in 1989–1990 when he averaged 25.8 points per game.

In October 2002, he became the first player to make 900 three point shots in the Úrvalsdeild. After the 2002–2003 season, he became co-coach of Keflavík with Falur Harðarson and announced he would not continue playing with the team. He appeared in one game during the 2003–2004 season, a Cup game on 29 November 2003 against Þróttur Vogum, where he scored 11 points in Keflavík's 86-136 victory.

After starting the 2005–2006 season with Léttir in the 2. deild karla, Guðjón returned to Keflavík in November 2005 as an assistant coach and player. On 26 February 2006, he broke Teitur Örlygsson record for most games played in the Úrvalsdeild when he played his 406th game. The record would later be broken by Marel Örn Guðlaugsson.

National team career
From 1988 to 1999, Guðjón played 122 games for the Icelandic national team.

Coaching career
Guðjón coached Keflavík during the 2003–2004 season along with Falur Harðarson and together they guided the team to the 2004 national championship. He coached the team again from 2009 to 2011, taking the team to the playoffs in both seasons.

Awards and accomplishments

Titles
Icelandic championship (6): 1989, 1992, 1993, 1997, 1999, 2003
Icelandic Cup (5): 1993, 1994, 1995, 1997, 2003
Icelandic Company Cup (4): 1996, 1997, 1998, 2002
Icelandic Super Cup: 1997

Individual awards
Icelandic Basketball Player of the Year: 1997
Úrvalsdeild Domestic All-First team: 1990

References

External links
Úrvalsdeild statistics at kki.is

1967 births
Living people
Auburn Montgomery Warhawks men's basketball players
Gudjon Skulason
Icelandic expatriate basketball people in the United States
Gudjon Skulason
Gudjon Skulason
Gudjon Skulason
Gudjon Skulason
Gudjon Skulason
Gudjon Skulason